Reynek may refer to:

People
 Bohuslav Reynek,  (1892-1971), Czech poet, writer, painter and translator
 Jiří Reynek, (1929–2014), Czech poet and graphic artist

Other
 59830 Reynek, main-belt asteroid